Bohdan Pociej (17 January 1933 – 3 March 2011) was a Polish musicologist and writer who studied historical parallels between music and philosophy. His work mainly focused on Baroque and Romantic music. He wrote about the phenomenology of Husserl and Ingarden, and also about hermeneutics. Pociej was the author of several documents about Bach and Mahler; he examined music's role in the cultural complex and the intellectual trends of its period.

Life and education
Pociej was born in Warsaw, and received his primary and secondary education in Silesia.

In 1952 he began studies in the Department of Polish Studies at the University of Warsaw, but after a year he transferred to the newly formed Department of Musicology at the same university. In 1959 he received his Master of Arts degree for a dissertation on The Output of François Couperin (1668–1733) in Regard to His Harpsichord Pieces.

He lived in Podkowa Leśna.

Career
In 1957 Pociej began writing criticism for Ruch muzyczny (The Musical Movement), a music periodical; in 1959 he became an editor there. He published in many of Poland's culture magazines, including Przegląd kulturalny (The Cultural Review), Tygodnik Powszechny (The Catholic Weekly), Nowe Książki (New Books), Więź (The Link), Znak (The Sign) and Twórczość (Creative Work).

He made several series of radio broadcasts for Polish Radio 2, focusing on classical music, culture and the arts. He was a visiting lecturer at the Music Academies in Kraków and Warsaw, and took part in academic conferences, particularly on early music and the philosophy of music.

In 1983–85 Bohdan Pociej joined the Musicologists' Section in the Polish Composers' Union. He was also a member of the Polish Writers' Association and the Polish Philosophical Association.

Thought 
Bohdan Pociej studied and wrote about both in musicology and philosophy. He called the domain of his writings  "historiosophy".

Pociej described analogies between the thinking of composers and philosophers, including medieval parallels between the ideas of Thomas Aquinas and the Ars Nova musical period; parallels between the monadic system of Leibniz and the polyphonic musical forms of Bach; and the analogy between the thought of Hegel and the musical creation of Beethoven. He used terms coined by Leibniz or Kant play crucial role to explain the metaphysics of music. This combination of the philosophical and musical systems of one time period is demonstrated in his book Jan Sebastian Bach – muzyka i wielkość (Johann Sebastian Bach – Music and Greatness). 

In his books, Mahler and Romantyzm bez granic (Romanticism without borders), Pociej described three stages of musical imagination in the Romantic composers: musical craftsmanship, emotionality, and   “pure inwardness revealed in music” (expression of objective feelings so that they are experienced spiritually by the listener). The attainment of this third stage he asserted to be rare, appearing in the works of (Schubert, Mahler and Bruckner).

In 2003, an M.A. dissertation about Bohdan Pociej's musical writing was submitted at the Department of Musicology, University of Warsaw.

Works 
 Klawesyniści francuscy (French harpsichord players), PWM, Kraków 1969
 Jan Sebastian Bach – muzyka i wielkość (Johann Sebastian Bach – Music and Greatness) PWM, Kraków 1972
 Lutosławski a wartość muzyki (Lutosławski and the value of music), PWM, Kraków 1976
 Szkice z późnego romantyzmu, (Sketches on late Romanticism) PWM, Kraków 1978
 Gustav Mahler, PWM, Kraków 1992
 Wagner, PWM, Kraków 2004
 Bycie w muzyce. Próba opisania twórczości Henryka Mikołaja Góreckiego (Being in music. An attempted description of Henryk Mikołaj Górecki's creative output), Academy of Music in Katowice 2005
 Z perspektywy muzyki. Wybór szkiców (From the perspective of music. A selection of sketches), Biblioteka "Więzi", Warszawa 2005
 Romantyzm bez granic (Romanticism without borders), Biblioteka "Więzi", Warszawa 2008

Pociej also contributed to the New Grove Dictionary of Music and Musicians.

References 

 Leszek Polony: Pociej Bohdan in: Encyklopedia Muzyczna PWM (Encyclopedia of Music), biographical part edited by  Elżbieta Dziębowska, vol. „pe-r”, PWM, Kraków 2004

External links
 biographical profile at Polmic.pl

1933 births
2011 deaths
Polish musicologists